Gmina Rokitno is a rural gmina (administrative district) in Biała Podlaska County, Lublin Voivodeship, in eastern Poland on the border with Belarus.

The gmina contains part of the protected area called Podlasie Bug Gorge Landscape Park.

Villages
Gmina Rokitno contains the villages and settlements of Cieleśnica, Cieleśnica PGR, Derło, Hołodnica, Klonownica Duża, Kołczyn, Kołczyn-Kolonia, Lipnica, Michałki, Michałki-Kolonia, Olszyn, Pokinianka, Pratulin, Rokitno, Rokitno-Kolonia, Zaczopki and Zaczopki-Kolonia.

Neighbouring gminas
Gmina Rokitno is bordered by the gminas of Biała Podlaska, Janów Podlaski, Terespol and Zalesie. It also borders Belarus.

References

External links
Polish official population figures 2006

Gminas in Lublin Voivodeship
Biała Podlaska County